Badimia multiseptata is a species of lichen in the family Pilocarpaceae. Found in Asia, it was described as new to science in 2011 by Khwanruan Papong and Robert Lücking.

References

Pilocarpaceae
Lichen species
Lichens described in 2011
Lichens of Asia
Taxa named by Robert Lücking